Cotkytle is a municipality and village in Ústí nad Orlicí District in the Pardubice Region of the Czech Republic. It has about 400 inhabitants.

Administrative parts
Villages of Herbortice, Janoušov and Mezilesí are administrative parts of Cotkytle.

References

External links

Villages in Ústí nad Orlicí District